Cutaneous focal mucinosis is a skin condition characterized by a solitary nodule or papule.

See also 
 List of cutaneous conditions

References 

Mucinoses